Phiala bistrigata is a moth in the family Eupterotidae. It was described by Per Olof Christopher Aurivillius in 1901. It is found in South Africa and Tanzania.

References

Moths described in 1901
Eupterotinae